"Ring-a-Ding Girl" is episode 133 of the American television anthology series The Twilight Zone. It originally aired on December 27, 1963 on CBS. In this episode, a movie star (played by Maggie McNamara) receives a mystical summon to return to her hometown on a matter of life and death.

Opening narration

Plot
Barbara "Bunny" Blake is a movie star living in Hollywood, California. Her hometown fan club in Howardsville, Virginia sends her a ring, and she tells her manager that her loyalty is still to her town because they all chipped in to help her go to Hollywood to pursue her career. Looking into the stone, she sees her sister Hildy imploring Bunny to come home. Though she has been hired to make a movie in Rome, Bunny makes an impromptu trip to Howardsville to surprise Hildy and her family.

Hildy and her son Bud hope that Bunny will attend the annual founder's day picnic, which coincidentally happens to be that very afternoon. Upon hearing this and after seeing a vision of local television newsreader Ben Braden also asking her to "come home", Bunny suffers a seizure, and Hildy calls over an old friend, the town doctor, who diagnoses that Bunny has been working too hard at her acting career and orders her to rest, despite her claiming that she was faking the seizure as an excuse to call him over. As he is also the chairman/organizer for the annual founder's day picnic, Bunny requests that he postpone the entire event so that she can see her friends in more personal settings, but he refuses and interprets her request as a sign that she has been spoiled by her Hollywood lifestyle.

As she sees a vision of her high school's custodian, Cyrus Gentry, requesting her help for the town, Bunny flees to the bathroom. The doctor gives Bunny's prescription slip to Hildy, but Bunny insists on accompanying Bud to the drugstore. On the way, they stop by her old school to meet Gentry, whom she asks to leave the school gates open. She then goes to the local TV station for an impromptu interview with Braden. In the interview, she announces a one-woman show in the high school gymnasium for the same time as the picnic. When Braden points out the conflict, she flippantly says the people will enjoy her show more.

Hildy accuses Bunny of "showing off" by forcing the town to choose between seeing her or attending the picnic. Bunny insists that she loves the town and its people and that she is using her show as a way of thanking them. Hildy at first says that she and Bud are going to the picnic. When Bunny sees a vision in her ring of a jetliner and its passengers, including herself and her manager, Hildy reconsiders and agrees to attend Bunny's show. As they are about to leave, it begins to rain. As they hear sirens outside, Bunny envisions herself on the jetliner in the rain, and she hugs her slightly bewildered sister. A breaking news flash comes on over the radio, and while Hildy and Bud are listening to the first reports of an airplane crash, Bunny quietly says goodbye, goes outside in the rain and vanishes.

A police officer calls to inform Hildy that Bunny is among the deceased passengers on the plane. The radio news anchor notes conflicting reports from onlookers who said that Bunny was on the plane and several townspeople who had seen her in town that day. The anchorman notes that many of the townspeople were in the auditorium waiting to see Bunny's show and that they would have died had they gone to the picnic because the jetliner crashed on the grounds. Hildy finds Bunny's ring, which had fallen to the floor and is now chipped and charred, and she realizes that Bunny had predicted her impending death in the plane crash and had come in spirit via the ring to save her friends and family.

Closing narration

Cast
 Maggie McNamara as Barbara "Bunny" Blake
 Mary Munday as Hildy Powell
 David Macklin as Bud Powell
 Betty Lou Gerson as Cici
 Vic Perrin as State Trooper (Jim)
 George Mitchell as Dr. Floyd
 Bing Russell as Ben Braden
 Hank Patterson as Mr. Gentry
 Bill Hickman as Pilot

References

 DeVoe, Bill. (2008). Trivia from The Twilight Zone. Albany, GA: Bear Manor Media. 
 Grams, Martin. (2008). The Twilight Zone: Unlocking the Door to a Television Classic. Churchville, MD: OTR Publishing. 
 Zicree, Marc Scott: The Twilight Zone Companion.  Sillman-James Press, 1982 (second edition)

External links

1963 American television episodes
Astral projection in popular culture
The Twilight Zone (1959 TV series season 5) episodes